Below are the rosters for the 1996 CONCACAF Men's Pre-Olympic Tournament.

Canada
Coach:  Bob Lenarduzzi

Mexico

Costa Rica

El Salvador

Jamaica

Trinidad and Tobago

References

1996 in CONCACAF football
Football qualification for the 1996 Summer Olympics
1996 CONCACAF Men's Pre-Olympic Tournament